Port Adelaide Lighthouse is a lighthouse located on the North Parade of Port Adelaide.  It was first lit in 1869 at the entrance to the Port River near Outer Harbor.  In 1901, it was moved to the Neptune Islands and relocated to the current location in 1986. It is listed on the South Australian Heritage Register since 1980.   It is lit on Saturdays.

Entry

Open Times 
Weekdays - 10:00am to 2:00pm
Weekends - 10:30am to 4:00pm

Cost 
Adult - $1

Children - 50c

Free with South Australian Maritime Museum General Admission.

Gallery

See also

 List of lighthouses in Australia

References

External links
South Australian History Hub - Port Adelaide Lighthouse

Lighthouses completed in 1869
Lighthouses in South Australia
Lighthouse museums in Australia
1869 establishments in Australia
South Australian Heritage Register